Marie Madeleine de Vignerot du Pont de Courlay, Duchesse d'Aiguillon (160417 April 1675) was a French aristocrat, also remembered for her charitable work and her patronage of artists and mathematicians.

Biography
Courlay was the daughter of Cardinal Richelieu's sister, Françoise du Plessis, and her husband René du Vignerot.

In 1620 Courlay married a nephew of the constable de Luynes, Antoine de Beauvoir du Roure, sieur de Combalet, who died in 1622. In 1625, through her uncle's influence, she was made a lady-in-waiting (dame d'atour) to the queen-mother Marie de Medici, and in 1638 was created duchess of Aiguillon.

The Duchess did not marry a second time, although Richelieu wished to marry her to a prince, either to the comte de Soissons or to the king's brother. After the death of the cardinal in 1642, the Duchess retained her honours and titles, but withdrew from the court and devoted herself entirely to works of charity. She became a patron of work involving science and the arts, providing funding for many notable initiatives. She died on 17 April 1675.

Patron of science and arts
The Duchess worked with St. Vincent de Paul and helped him to establish the Bicêtre Hospital for foundlings. She also took part in re-organizing the Hôtel-Dieu de Paris and establishing several others in the provinces. Additionally, she founded and funded the establishment of the Hôtel-Dieu de Québec for the colonists of New France.

The Duchess was the patroness of Pierre Corneille, who in 1636 dedicated his tragedy Le Cid to her. She also had the vision to provide patronage to Marie Crous, a mathematician who introduced the decimal system to France with her published research.

Notes

References

External links

1604 births
1675 deaths
Marie Madeleine de Vignerot du Pont de Courlay, Duchesse d'Aiguillon
Peers created by Louis XIII
French ladies-in-waiting
Household of Marie de' Medici